Chenopodium strictum, the lateflowering goosefoot, is a species of annual herb in the family Amaranthaceae (pigweed). They have a self-supporting growth form and simple, broad leaves. Individuals can grow to 55 cm tall.

Sources

References 

strictum
Flora of Malta